O Canto da Cidade (Portuguese for "The Chant of the Town") is the second studio album by Brazilian axé/MPB singer Daniela Mercury, released in 1992 in Brazil and on March 23, 1993 in North America and Europe through Sony Music.

Background 
Later in 1992, Daniela Mercury went to a project called "Som do Meio-Dia" (Midday Sound), when she played at the Art Museum of São Paulo (MASP). The show brought together over thirty thousand spectators, which eventually leave the traffic jam in the vicinity of the Paulista Avenue. After a forty-minute concert, Daniela was removed from the stage by representatives of the São Paulo tourist office, that concerned with the museum structure, obtained an order from the military police to remove it from the local.

Soon after the show, Daniela was hired by Sony Music label and through this, released her second solo album, O Canto da Cidade. The album sold over 2.5 million copies in Brazil alone (which made Mercury the first artist to receive a double-diamond certification in her country) and was considered by journalist André Domingues  one of the best MPB albums ever. O Canto da Cidade is Mercury's album with most number-one songs (four in total; "O Canto da Cidade", "O Mais Belo dos Belos", "Batuque" and "Você Não Entende Nada/Cotidiano"). The songs "Só Pra Te Mostrar", a duet with Herbert Vianna, and "Bandidos da América" made a moderate success in the Brazilian radio stations, reaching number nine and twenty-one in the charts, respectively. O Canto da Cidade is recognized as the album responsible for taking Axé Music to mainstream audiences in Brazil.

The album also yielded Mercury, a year-end special on Rede Globo channel, which were mixed with live performances in the square of Apotheosis in Rio de Janeiro, and video clips with Caetano Veloso, Herbert Vianna and Tom Jobim. Years later, the special, previously unreleased in video was released on DVD to celebrate the 15th anniversary of the release of the album. In July 1993, Mercury was one of Brazil's attractions at the prestigious Montreux Jazz Festival in Switzerland.

Some consider O Canto da Cidade was the forerunner of the samba-reggae movement, then called Axé Music, gaining strength in all regions of the country and allowing other genre artists, were featured in the Brazilian music scene. It is believed that after this album, the Carnival of Bahia gained a massive media coverage. Mercury experienced during this period, a peak of popularity rarely seen in the history of Brazilian music industry, being dubbed "the hurricane of Bahia" and "Queen of the Axé".

Track listing

Notes
"Você Não Entende Nada" contains "Cotidiano" by Chico Buarque as incidental song.

Awards
Prêmio Sharp – Special award for best song ("O Canto da Cidade")
Prêmio Sharp – Award for best female singer (regional)

Sales and certifications

Release history

See also
 List of best-selling Latin albums

References

External links
About the album in Mercury's official website
[ A review of the album] at Allmusic

1992 albums
Daniela Mercury albums
Albums produced by Liminha